Bellia picta is a species of crab that lives around the coasts of South America, and the only species in the genus Bellia. On the Atlantic coast, it is found in Rio Grande do Sul, Brazil, while on the Pacific coast, it is found off Peru and Chile. It probably lives in burrows and is a filter feeder.

References

External links

Crabs
Crustaceans of the eastern Pacific Ocean
Crustaceans of the Atlantic Ocean
Monotypic decapod genera
Taxa named by Henri Milne-Edwards